Lessor may refer to: 

 Lessor (leasing), the owner of leased property or the agent authorized on the owner's behalf
Lessor, Wisconsin, a town in U.S.A.
Lessor Township, Minnesota, U.S.A.

See also
 Lesser